This is a list of plum dishes. Plum dishes are those that use plums or prunes as a primary ingredient. Some plum dishes also use other fruits in their preparation. Plum and prune snack foods and beverages are also included in this list.

Plum dishes

 
 
 Colțunași – dumpling sometimes prepared with a filling of a whole plum
 
 Erik Ași – plum dish in Turkish cuisine prepared with prunes, rice and sugar
 
 
 
 
  – some varieties are prepared using plum
 
 
 
 
 
 
 
 
 
 
 
 
 
 Suanmeitang – traditional Chinese beverage made from sour plums (specifically, smoked Chinese plums), rock sugar, and other ingredients such as sweet osmanthus.

See also

 List of culinary fruits
 List of fruit dishes
 Lists of prepared foods

References

 
Plum